World conquest was a play by mail wargame published for play in 1988 by Prime Time Simulations. It was an "operational level game of land, sea and air warfare".

Development
Prime Time Simulations published the game in 1988. By 1992, the publisher had released its successor, Modern World Conquest, while World Conquest was still active.

Gameplay
World Conquest was a "fast paced simulation of combined arms conflict." Each game comprised 12 players in a World War II setting, with players governing a nation on a 50×60 grid map with 30 types of available combat units. The object of the game was to "be the first player to capture twelve cities and hold them for one full turn". The game allowed players to choose strategies such as: land-based, sea-based, air-based, technology research-focused, and others.

Players began in their capital cities which were at the center of their territories. As these territories were unmapped, exploration was a central part of early play, in order to capture neutral cities. The primary element of gameplay was the unit, of which there were thirty types. Players could produce units with "buildsteps" generated by cities or villages, all of which produced different numbers of buildsteps. Unit costs ranged from two at the low end to twenty for battleships at the top end, while most units cost between two and six. Other unit types included: artillery, basic infantry, fighters, mechanized infantry, paratroopers, rocket, special forces, and tanks. Each unit had an experience level from green, trained, veteran, crack, to elite.

Turns were divided into five phases, during which players accounted for a number of variables when moving and conducting combat operations. Combat could be a fairly simple affair between two units or it could be a "highly complex and mind-boggling affair" with multiple players and unit types involved on a single game square.

Reception
In 1991, reviewer Mark Macagnone stated in Paper Mayhem magazine that the game was "good, with a little more effort it can be great!" In the same issue, Randall E. Black also reviewed the game, stating that he "really enjoyed the game, and felt it gave great value for the money." Out of a possible 5, he rated the game a 4 for its rule book and enjoyment, 5 for dollar value and gamemaster response, and 3 for playability, while placing its complexity in the medium to complex range. Reviewer Jack Herriman II said in 1993 that World Conquest was "made for inventive people" in that it allowed many different possibilities for force generation to pursue campaigns. The game was listed as the #9 of 84 play-by-mail games in the Sep/Oct 1992 issue of Paper Mayhem magazine, and was listed in the same issue as the #1 play-by-mail game for games with over 100 voting responses.

See also
 List of play-by-mail games
 Paper Mayhem
 Play-by-mail game

Notes and references

Notes

References

Bibliography
 
 
 
 
 
 
 
 
 

Play-by-mail games